Raymond Weill (28 January 1874 – 13 July 1950) was a French archaeologist specialized in Egyptology.

Biography 
Born on 28 January 1874 in Elbeuf, 28 January 1874 in Elbeuf began his career in the military before starting a career with Gaston Maspero at the École pratique des hautes études at the age of 30, where he taught from 1928 to 1945.

He specialized in the history of Ancient Egypt, specifically the Second Intermediate Period. He published several works on the end of the 12th dynasty and the Hyksos. Towards the end of his life, he came to the conviction that Hyksos had reigned as local kings in the Nile Delta during the late 12th Dynasty.

Weill was one of the first archaeologists to undertake excavations in Wadi Hilweh, Jerusalem, a site he first referred to as "City of David" after identifying it as the place where David is said to have set up his capital. He died on 13 July 1950 in Paris.

Works 
 Les Décrets Royaux de l'Ancien Égyptien … étude sur les décrets royaux trouvés à Koptos … 1910 et 1911. 1912.
 La fin du Moyen Empire Égyptien: étude sur les monuments et l'histoire de la période comprise entre la 12e et la 18e dynastie. 1918.
 La Cité de David, 1913-1914, Paris: P. Geuthner, 1920.
 Bases, méthodes et resultats de la Chronologie Égyptienne. 1926–1928.
 Douzième Dynastie, royauté de Haute-Égypte et domination Hyksos dans le nord. 1953 (postum).

Bibliography 
 Morris L. Bierbrier: Who Was Who in Egyptology. 4th revised edition. Egypt Exploration Society, London 2012, p. 571.

References 

1874 births
1950 deaths
École pratique des hautes études alumni
Academic staff of the École pratique des hautes études
French Egyptologists
People from Elbeuf